Ramanichandran is a Tamil romance novelist.

Early life and family
She was born on 10 July 1938 to Ganesan and Kamalam in Kayamozhi Village near Thiruchendur in South Tamil Nadu.

Career
She has written novels, most of which first appeared serialized in magazines like Kumudam and Aval Vikatan and were later brought out in book format by Arunodhayam. They include ValaiOsai, Mayangugiral oru madhu, Venmayil ethanai nirangal, Adivazhai.

Her stories feature "no caste conflict, no religious conflict, no terminal illnesses, no characters with serious vices." They are "100% soft romance".

List of novels

ValaiOsai 
Mayangugiral oru madhu 
Venmayil ethanai nirangal 
Adivazhai
Urangatha Kangal
Avanum Avalum
Kadhalenum Solayiley
Lavanya
Banumathi
Madhumathi
Chandhini
 Raman Thediya Seethai
 Nila Kayum Neram
 Un mugam kandenadi
 Maane maane maane

References

Living people
Tamil-language writers
Indian women novelists
Novelists from Tamil Nadu
21st-century Indian novelists
21st-century Indian women writers
Women writers from Tamil Nadu
20th-century Indian women writers
20th-century Indian novelists
1938 births